Japanese Cemetery was founded in 1901 and is located at 1300 Hillside Boulevard in Colma, California. This cemetery has brought together the Japanese community in California and has worked with Buddhist, Shinto, and Christian religious organizations.

History 
In the beginning of the 20th century, most Japanese living in San Francisco were buried in either the Masonic Cemetery or the Laurel Hill Cemetery (formerly Lone Hill Cemetery), in the Lone Mountain neighborhood. In 1901, all burials were forbidding in the city of San Francisco due to a law change. In 1901, the Jikei-kai Japanese Benevolent Society of California purchased two acres of land in Colma to create a cemetery; and some graves from Laurel Hill and Masonic Cemeteries in San Francisco were moved here. On March 17, 1903, Jōdo Shinshū cleric Rev. Nishijima Kakyuro officiated the opening ceremony for the cemetery. 

In 1906, the Meiji-era Emperor of Japan provided a grant to help bury Japanese in California.

Notable burials 
The oldest graves appear to be from 1860 from the three Japanese warship Kanrin Maru crew members, which pre-dating the Japanese Cemetery of Colma. In 1860, three Japanese sailors aboard the Kanrin Maru warship died during the first Japanese Embassy to the United States. The sailors had been buried at the Marine Hospital Cemetery (which closed in 1870) in San Francisco, then later transferred to Laurel Hill Cemetery in San Francisco, and followed by a move to the Japanese Cemetery in Colma.
 Kyutaro Abiko (1865–1936), Japanese-born American businessman and newspaper editor; founder of Nichi Bei Times.
 (1863–1914), politician, pastor, and educator; sent to alleviate the anti-Japanese sentiment. 
Keisaburo Koda (1882–1964), businessperson, rice farmer, founder of Koda Farms.
 George Shima (1864–1926), businessperson, potato farmer, the first Japanese American millionaire.

See also 

 List of cemeteries in California
 Japanese cemeteries and cenotaphs

References 

Cemeteries in San Mateo County, California
History of San Mateo County, California
Protected areas of San Mateo County, California
Japanese-American culture in San Francisco
Japanese-American history
1901 establishments in California